is a Japanese manga series written and illustrated by Miko Yasu. It has been serialized in Kodansha's Morning since November 2017. A television drama adaptation aired on Nippon TV from July to September 2021, and an anime television series adaptation by Madhouse aired from January to March 2022.

As of August 2021, the manga had over 2.3 million copies in circulation. Police in a Pod won the 66th Shogakukan Manga Award in the general category in 2021 and the 45th Kodansha Manga Award in the same category in 2022.

Plot
Mai Kawai is a new police officer who only decided to take the job due to a desire to have a stable income. Having become dissatisfied with her career path, she decides to resign from the police force. On the day she planned to tender her resignation, she meets Seiko Fuji, who had been reassigned to serve as the director of her station. Fuji's dedication to the police force becomes an inspiration to Kawai, who decides to delay her resignation. The series follows the two and other members of the police forms solving crimes in their local area.

Characters

 Kawai is a fresh graduate from police academy. She joined the Okajima Prefectural Police in order to have a stable income unlike her father, whose livelihood was affected by the corrupt practices of the company. However, she has had enough of the unkind remarks thrown her way as a police officer. But, just when she was about to submit her letter of resignation, a new instructor is assigned to her. 

 Kawai's partner and instructor. She is nicknamed "Miss Perfect". She previously belonged to the local police's Criminal Affairs Division but was reassigned.

He is part of the police department's investigation department. His strong interrogation skills have led him to being called an "interrogation genius".

Media

Manga
The series finished its first part on June 16, 2022, and Yasu put the manga on hiatus to work on a new manga series. Kodansha has collected its chapters into individual tankōbon volumes. The first volume was released on April 23, 2018. As of October 21, 2022, twenty-two volumes have been released.

The series is licensed in English digitally by Kodansha USA. The first volume was released on June 8, 2021. As of June 14, 2022, thirteen volumes have been released.

Volume list

Drama
A Japanese television drama adaptation aired for nine episodes on Nippon TV from July 7 to September 15, 2021. Two special episodes aired on August 4 and August 11, 2021. RöE performed the opening "YY", and milet performed the ending theme "Ordinary Days".

Anime
An anime television series adaptation was announced on August 1, 2021. The series is animated by Madhouse and directed by Yuzo Sato, with Ryunosuke Kingetsu overseeing the scripts, Kei Tsuchiya designing the characters, and Nobuaki Nobusawa composing the music. It aired from January 5 to March 30, 2022 on AT-X and other networks. Riko Azuna performed the opening theme "Shiranakya" (I Gotta Know), while Nonoc performed the ending theme "Change". Funimation licensed the series outside of Asia. Muse Communication licensed the series in South and Southeast Asia.

Episode list

Reception
As of August 2021, Police in a Pod had over 2.3 million copies in circulation. It was one of the Jury Recommended Works at the 22nd Japan Media Arts Festival in 2019. Police in a Pod won the Mandō Kobayashi Manga Grand Prix 2019, created by comedian and manga enthusiast Kendo Kobayashi. In 2021, along with Dead Dead Demon's Dededede Destruction, the series won the 66th Shogakukan Manga Award in the general category. The manga was nominated for the 45th Kodansha Manga Award in the general category in 2021; it won the 46th edition in the same category in 2022. The series ranked #23 on the 2021 "Book of the Year" list by Da Vinci magazine; it ranked #13 on the 2022 list.

Notes

References

External links
 
 

2017 manga
2021 Japanese television series debuts
2021 Japanese television series endings
2022 anime television series debuts
Anime series based on manga
AT-X (TV network) original programming
Comedy anime and manga
Funimation
Kodansha manga
Madhouse (company)
Manga adapted into television series
Muse Communication
Nippon TV original programming
Police in anime and manga
Seinen manga
Winner of Kodansha Manga Award (General)
Winners of the Shogakukan Manga Award for general manga